Marcus Brandon is a politician from Greensboro, North Carolina who served in the North Carolina House of Representatives. A Democrat, he represented the 60th district from January 2011 through the end of 2014. In 2015, Brandon became the executive director of NorthCarolinaCan a nonprofit education policy and advocacy organization.

Early life and career
A lifelong resident of Guilford County, North Carolina, Brandon graduated from Southern Guilford High School, class of 1993. He went on to attend North Carolina Agricultural and Technical State University (NC A&T) where he majored in political science.

Brandon is a political consultant by profession. He worked for NGP Software, a supplier of campaign software, and later served as national finance director for Dennis Kucinich's 2008 presidential campaign.

Political career
North Carolina's 60th state house district includes parts of Greensboro, High Point and Pleasant Garden. Brandon challenged four-term incumbent Rep. Earl Jones in the Democratic primary held on May 4, 2010 and defeated him by 60% to 40%. The district is majority African American and heavily Democratic; in the 2010 general election Brandon, who is African-American, defeated his Republican opponent by a wide margin, taking 70% of the vote. He took office in January 2011.

In 2012, he again faced Earl Jones, who ran to reclaim his former seat. In the Democratic primary held on May 8, 2012, Brandon defeated Jones by 66% to 34%. He was unchallenged in the 2012 general election on November 6, 2012.

Brandon was named one of "12 State Legislators to Watch in 2014" by Governing.com.

Brandon ran for the House seat vacated by former Congressman Mel Watt but lost the Democratic primary to Alma Adams.

Personal
Brandon is openly gay. He was the only openly LGBT member of the North Carolina General Assembly during his term.

Electoral history

2014

2012

2010

References

External links
Legislative homepage
NorthCarolinaCan

Living people
1975 births
People from Greensboro, North Carolina
Politicians from Greensboro, North Carolina
20th-century African-American people
21st-century American politicians
21st-century African-American politicians
LGBT African Americans
Gay politicians
African-American state legislators in North Carolina
LGBT state legislators in North Carolina
Democratic Party members of the North Carolina House of Representatives